Ryan Stahr Kulchinsky (born January 7, 1978) is an American rock singer-songwriter from Long Island, New York, currently signed on Island Records. His first major label record 11:59, released via Atlantic in 2010, reached No. 31 on Billboard 200 and No. 10 on Billboard Rock albums chart. Star became known to a wider audience as contestant on the CBS reality TV show Rock Star: Supernova in 2006. His songs have featured on several TV shows and promotion. His song "Brand New Day", featured as the main theme to Fox TV series Lie to Me, earned him a BMI TV Music Award in May 2009.

His first single for Island Records, "Stay Awhile" reached No. 28 on Billboard Adult Pop Songs, and its music video has logged over 1 million views on YouTube to date.

"Stay Awhile" was released on iTunes August 14, 2012.

Early life
Star was born in Huntington, New York on Long Island, and grew up in nearby Dix Hills. He was 14 years old when he formed his first band called Stage. They released four EPs – "Black" in 1997, "Blue" in 1999, "White" in 2000 and "The Final" in 2004, and in 1995 studio album "Historical Underdosing" and a self-titled album on Maverick Records in 2003. While still in high school, the band played CBGB's and the Mercury Lounge.

When the band parted ways, Star became the solo artist R.Star and released his independently produced debut solo album Songs from the Eye of an Elephant on Stone Crow Records in 2005, some songs of Stage was re-recorded for the album (Perfect, Perfect Time Of Night (Back Of Your Car), "O", Sink Or Swim).

Television
Star was a contestant on the second season of CBS' reality show Rock Star where Tommy Lee's band Supernova was looking for a lead singer to front the supergroup. On the show, Ryan consistently showed his diverse style from melodic and moving piano to rocking, and was nicknamed Ryan "The Darkhorse" Star by show commentator Dave Navarro.  He was eventually eliminated, and days later, Mark Burnett, the show's producer, set up Ryan and the show's House Band to record a live album, to help Ryan jump start his career. He returned to the show on week 11 with the help of his fans through SMS voting, to perform an encore performance of "Back of Your Car", and was awarded a Honda CR-V.

Ryan Star appeared on the Rachael Ray show and performed "Breathe" and "Start a Fire" (aired October 6, 2010).

Ryan Star appeared on the Tonight Show with Jay Leno and performed "Stay Awhile" (aired August 14, 2012)

Ryan Star and band performed "Stay Awhile" on VH1 Big Morning Buzz (aired September 7, 2012)

Career
Atlantic Records released Last Train Home EP on June 16, 2009, of four songs to appear on Star's album.

The music video for "Breathe", premiered on CNN.com October 21, 2009, highlighted 18 unemployed people in various occupations and the website Ryan Star established breathe4jobs.com to allow potential employers to contact those appearing in the video. VH-1 interviewed Ryan Star on its VH-1 Top 20 show where he spoke of the positive effects of the video for his song "Breathe." One of the people in the video successfully found a job because of the video.

Star's first major label studio album, titled 11:59, was released on August 3, 2010, with a sold-out performance that night at New York City's famed Irving Plaza. The album debuted at No. 10 on the Billboard Rock Albums chart, and at No. 31 on Billboard.com.

Ryan Star released a free EP to his fans in January 2012, titled The America EP via Twitter and Facebook. The songs "Orphans" and "Somebody's Son" were initially meant to be released on 11:59. The EP is dedicated to Star's grandfather who fought in World War II.

As Atlantic showed no interest to support his new song, Ryan Star recorded and self-released a music video for "Stay Awhile" in February 2012, getting attention from MTV Buzzworthy as a breakthrough hit. The video has reached over 1 million views on YouTube as of August 2012. The song also charted on Hot AC and Adult Pop Songs charts based on radioplay. Eventually, on August 6, 2012, Star and his management announced via Twitter that he had signed on with a new record label Island Records. Ryan Star said that he made his decision after consulting with Jon Bon Jovi, whose band has been on Island for 30 years. The label's reaction to his song meant a lot to him as well.

His single "Stay Awhile" was released via Island Records August 14, 2012. Ryan and his band made their late night television debut on The Tonight Show with Jay Leno on the same day.

Star will release a 5-song EP Animals, recorded with his touring band in Rhinebeck, New York, on August 5, 2013. The single from the EP, "Impossible" is currently streaming exclusively at Billboard.com.

Touring
Ryan has been on the road in support of "Stay Awhile". 
Recently opening for Andy Grammer, Ryan has previously toured with Parlotones, Bon Jovi, Train, The Script, Rob Thomas, Collective Soul, O.A.R. and David Cook.

Star opened for Bon Jovi on three dates of their Bon Jovi Live tour in March 2011, and for the Goo Goo Dolls during the October–November 2011 stretch of their Something for the Rest of Us Tour.

Songwriting
"Last Train Home" was featured on the soundtrack for the movie P.S. I Love You (premiered December 21, 2007)
"This Could Be The Year" was featured on the WWE Survivor Series (aired November 23, 2008)
"Losing Your Memory" was featured on the episode 2x13 "Daddy Issues" of the Vampire Diaries (aired February 3, 2011)
"Brand New Day" was the theme song for the TV series Lie to Me (aired January 21, 2009 – January 31, 2011)
Besides his own music, Ryan Star has songwriting credits on other artists' releases, such as:
 We are Unbreakable – Hedley
 My Oh My – Tristan Prettyman
 Screaming – James Durbin
 Don't Stop – Electric Touch
 Right Here With You – David Cook
 A Perfect World – Takida

Discography

Studio albums

EPs

Singles

Music videos

Other appearances
These songs have been released on albums that were not a studio album released by Star.

On December 3, 2010, Ryan Star performed for the 101.9 FM Miracle on State Street in Chicago Illinois, along with Ingrid Michaelson, and Maroon 5.

Songs in other media

References

External links

Living people
American rock musicians
Singers from New York (state)
People from Huntington, New York
Rockstar: Supernova contestants
Island Records artists
People from Dix Hills, New York
1978 births
21st-century American male singers
21st-century American singers